Wilton may refer to:

Places

Australia 
 Wilton, New South Wales, a small town near Sydney

Canada
 Rural Municipality of Wilton No. 472, Saskatchewan

England 
Wilton, Cumbria
Wilton, Herefordshire
Wilton Castle
Wilton, Ryedale, North Yorkshire
Wilton, Redcar and Cleveland, North Yorkshire
Wilton Castle (Redcar and Cleveland)
Wilton International
Wilton, Somerset, a suburb of Taunton
Wilton, Wiltshire, a town near Salisbury
Wilton Abbey
Wilton House
Wilton, Marlborough, Wiltshire, a hamlet in Grafton parish near Marlborough
Wilton Windmill

Ireland 
Wilton, Cork, a suburb of Cork City
Wilton, County Offaly, a townland in Kilmanaghan civil parish, barony of Kilcoursey

New Zealand 
 Wilton, New Zealand, a suburb of Wellington

Scotland 
Wilton, Scottish Borders

United States 
Wilton, Alabama, a town
Wilton, Arkansas, a town
Wilton, California, a town
Wilton, Connecticut, a town
Wilton, Illinois, an unincorporated community
Wilton, Iowa, a city
Wilton, Maine, a New England town
Wilton (CDP), Maine, the main village in the town
Wilton, Minnesota, a city
Wilton, Missouri, an unincorporated community
Wilton, New Hampshire, a New England town
Wilton (CDP), New Hampshire, the main village in the town
Wilton, New York, a town
Wilton, North Dakota, a city
Wilton, Wisconsin, a village
Wilton (town), Wisconsin, a town adjacent to the village of Wilton
Wilton Manors, Florida, a city
Wilton Township, Waseca County, Minnesota, a township
 Listings on the National Register of Historic Places:
 Wilton (Wye Mills, Maryland), listed on the NRHP in Maryland
 Wilton House Museum, listed on the NRHP in Richmond, Virginia
 Wilton (Wilton, Virginia), listed on the NRHP in Virginia

Zimbabwe 
 Wilton, Zimbabwe, a village in the Mashonaland East province

People

Surname
 Earl of Wilton, a title in the Peerage of the United Kingdom
 Frank Wilton (1905–1977), American football player and coach
 Greg Wilton (1955–2000), Australian politician
 Joseph Wilton (1722–1803), English sculptor
 Michael Wilton (born 1962), American guitarist
 Penelope Wilton (born 1946), British actor
 Richard Wilton (died 1239), English scholar
 Robb Wilton (1881–1957), English comedian and comic actor
 Robert Wilton (1868–1925), British journalist
 Spencer Wilton (born 1983), British equestrian
 William de Wylton (or Wilton), English medieval university chancellor
 Wilton Sampaio, Brazilian football referee

Fictional characters
 Mavis Wilton (née Riley), from the British soap opera Coronation Street
 Derek Wilton, Mavis's husband
 Harrison Wilton and Meadow Wilton, from the American TV series American Horror Story: Cult

Given name
 Effie Marie Wilton later Effie Bancroft (1839–1921), English actress and theatre manager
 Wilton R. Earle (1902–1964), American cell biologist
 Wilton Ivie (1907–1969), American arachnologist
 Wilton Mkwayi (1923–2004), South African activist and politician, member of uMkhonto we Sizwe
 Wilt Chamberlain (1936–1999), full name Wilton Norman Chamberlain, American basketball player and actor
 Wilton (footballer) (1947-2009), Brazilian football midfielder and manager
 Wílton Figueiredo (born 1982), Brazilian football midfielder
 Wilton López (born 1983), Nicaraguan baseball player
 Wilton Speight (born 1994), American football player

Other uses 
 Wilton carpet, a specific type of pile carpet
 Wilton culture, an archaeological culture from Africa
 Wilton Brands, a baking, cake decorating and candy making company owned by Dr. Oetker

See also 
 Wilson (disambiguation)
 Wilt (disambiguation)